Veselčani is a village in Municipality of Prilep. It used to be part of the former municipality of Topolčani.

Demographics
According to the 1467-68 Ottoman defter, Veselčani appears being largely inhabited by an Albanian population. The register displayed mixed Albanian and Slavic anthroponymy. The names are: Gjon Arbanas, Rela Dimitri, Vlkashin son of Marin, Gropça son of Gjon, Tano son of Gropça, Todor son of Gjon.

According to the 2002 census, the village had a total of 98 inhabitants. Ethnic groups in the village include:

Macedonians 98

References

Villages in Prilep Municipality